Derrick Jensen (April 27, 1956 – April 7, 2017) was a professional American football tight end in the National Football League. He played eight seasons for the Oakland/Los Angeles Raiders. He scored a touchdown after blocking a punt in Super Bowl XVIII. Following his playing career, he worked as a scout for the Seattle Seahawks beginning in 1991. Jensen retired after being diagnosed with ALS in 2012.

High school and college career
Jensen grew up in Osawatomie, Kansas. While in high school, Jensen led the Osawatomie Trojans to their second state championship in 1973. OHS won its first state football championship in 1966 led by future Green Bay Packers QB Lynn Dickey.  After graduating from Osawatomie High School, Jensen attended Texas-Arlington. Jensen was a two-time Southland Conference MVP while at Texas-Arlington. He finished his career with 3,346 rushing yards, the first player in conference history to top 3,000 yards.

Professional career
Jensen was a third-round draft choice of the Oakland Raiders in 1978 and played in 106 games, starting 21, in his career, including a streak of 105 straight. He served as the captain of the Raiders’ special teams for five seasons and contributed a blocked punt, which he recovered for the first touchdown, in the Raiders’ 38-9 win over the Washington Redskins in Super Bowl XVIII.  He was also part of the Raiders’ Super Bowl XV championship team. He finished his Raiders career with 780 yards on 224 carries, with five touchdowns. He added 44 receptions and three scores and returned an onside kick 33 yards for a touchdown against the New York Giants in 1980.

Personal
Jensen's wife, Erica, died as a result of a hit-and-run automobile accident on December 31, 2009. They had one son, Davis, who was 12 years old at the time of his mother's passing.

Death
Jensen was diagnosed with ALS in 2012.  He died of complications from the disease on April 7, 2017 at his home in Panama City Beach, Florida.

References

1956 births
2017 deaths
Sportspeople from Waukegan, Illinois
American football tight ends
American football running backs
Texas–Arlington Mavericks football players
Oakland Raiders players
Los Angeles Raiders players
Neurological disease deaths in Florida
Deaths from motor neuron disease
People from Osawatomie, Kansas
People from Bay County, Florida
Players of American football from Illinois